Drug Efficacy Study Implementation (DESI) was a program begun by the Food and Drug Administration (FDA) in the 1960s after the requirement (in the Kefauver-Harris Drug Control Act) that all drugs be efficacious as well as safe, was made part of US law. The DESI program was intended to classify all pre-1962 drugs that were already on the market as either effective, ineffective, or needing further study.Pharmacy Today. August 2008.  FDA aims to remove unapproved drugs from market: Risk-based enforcement program focuses on  removing potentially harmful products  The Drug Efficacy Study Implementation (DESI) evaluated over 3,000 separate products and over 16,000 therapeutic claims. By 1984, final action had been completed on 3,443 products; of these, 2,225 were found to be effective, 1,051 were found not effective, and 167 were pending.

One of the early effects of the DESI study was the development of the Abbreviated New Drug Application (ANDA).

See also 
 Estes Kefauver
 Federal Food, Drug, and Cosmetic Act
 Inverse benefit law
 Regulation of therapeutic goods

References

External links
  National Academies of Sciences archives.  The Drug Efficacy Study of the National Research Council’s Division of Medical Sciences, 1966-1969
 Chhabra R, Kremzner ME, Kiliany BJ. FDA policy on unapproved drug products: past, present, and future. Ann Pharmacother. 2005 Jul-Aug;39(7-8):1260-4. 

American medical research
Pharmaceuticals policy
Food and Drug Administration